Billy Greer (born January 26, 1952) is an American musician, singer and songwriter known as the current bass guitarist for the band Kansas. He joined the band in their 1985 reformation, making his debut appearance on Power. He had previously worked with Kansas keyboardist/vocalist Steve Walsh in the band Streets, and works with his own band Seventh Key when not performing with Kansas. He also was a member of the 2009 Kansas side project Native Window along with Kansas members Phil Ehart, Richard Williams, and David Ragsdale.

In addition to performing, Greer manages his son's band 3 Story Fall and produces their music.

Discography

Kansas

Studio Albums 

 Power (1986)
 In The Spirit Of Things (1988)
 Freaks of Nature (1995)
 Always Never the Same (1998)
 Somewhere to Elsewhere (2000)
 The Prelude Implicit (2016)
 The Absence of Presence (2020)

Live Albums 

 Live at the Whisky (1992)
 King Biscuit Flower Hour Presents Kansas (1998)
 Dust in the Wind (2001)
 Device - Voice - Drum (2002)
 There's Know Place Like Home (2009)
 Leftoverture: Live and Beyond (2017)
 Point of Know Return: Live and Beyond (2021)

Seventh Key

Studio Albums 

 Seventh Key (2001)
 The Raging Fire (2004)

 I Will Survive (2013)

Live Albums 

 Live in Atlanta (2005)

Streets

Studio Albums 

 1st (1983)
 Crimes in Mind (1985)

Live Albums 

 King Biscuit Flower Hour Presents Streets (1997)

Native Window

Studio Albums 

 Native Window (2009)

References

External links
 Official website
  A career retrospective interview from 2014 by Pods & Sods podcast 

1952 births
Living people
People from Hawkins County, Tennessee
American rock bass guitarists
American male bass guitarists
Kansas (band) members
American male guitarists
20th-century American bass guitarists